Llano is the Spanish word for plain. It may refer to:

 Llano, California
 Llano Estacado, a region in northwest Texas and eastern New Mexico
 Llano, Texas, a small city in Llano County, Texas
 Llano County, Texas
 Llano River, a Texas river
 Llano Uplift, a geologic dome exposing Precambrian rocks in Central Texas.
 Gonzalo Queipo de Llano, a Spanish army-officer serving during the Spanish Civil War
 The Llanos, a plain in north-western South America
 Llanero, a person from the Llanos
 The Llano, a magical song from Piers Anthony's Incarnations of Immortality series
 The codename for the first AMD Accelerated Processing Unit microprocessor

See also
 Llanito, the local language of Gibraltar.
 Llanite, a variety of rhyolite with phenocrysts of microcline and blue quartz found in Llano County, Texas. 
 El Llano (disambiguation)
 Llanos (disambiguation)